Prince Sergei Konstantinovich Belosselsky-Belozersky (1867–1951) was a Russian aristocrat, general and member of the International Olympic Committee.

Early life
Prince Sergei was a member of the Belosselsky-Belozersky family and was in 1916 one of the largest landowners in Russia. He was the son of general Constantine Esperovich Beloselsky-Belozersky (Konstantin Esperovich Belosselsky-Belozersky; 1843–1920) and the former Nadezhna Dmitrovna Skobeleva (1847–1820), sister of general Mikhail Skobelev.

Career
Sergei graduated from the Imperial Cadet Corps in 1887 and was gazetted as a cornet in the Life Guards. He was attached to the Russian embassies in Berlin and Paris. He left military service in 1894 but returned in 1895. Between 1896 and 1905, he served as aide-de-camp to Grand Duke Vladimir Alexandrovich of Russia.  

From 1908, he commanded the 3rd Novorossiysk dragoon regiment and from 1913, the Uhlans (Lancers) of the Imperial Guard. He owned an estate on Krestovsky Island, where, in 1908, Nicolai, brother of Felix Yusupov, was killed in a duel with a jealous husband.

During World War I, he commanded the 2nd Guards Cavalry Division and the 3rd Don Cavalry Division. From 1915, he served on the Caucasus front under General Nikolai Baratov. On 1 January 1917, the body of Grigory Rasputin was found in the Malaya Neva near Bolshoy Petrovsky Bridge.

In 1917, he joined the white  movement and served on the staff of White Finnish leader, Carl Gustaf Emil Mannerheim during the Russian Civil War. He was subsequently a staff officer in the North Western Army of General Yudenich. After the end of the Civil War Prince Sergei settled in England and died in Tonbridge, where he befriended Denton Welch, in 1951.

Prince Sergei was a keen sportsman. He was one of the founders of the St Petersburg Sports Club and was Russian representative on the International Olympic Committee between 1900 and 1908.

Personal life
In 1894, Prince Sergei married Susan Tucker Whittier (1874–1934), daughter of Charles A. Whittier of Boston. Together, Sergei and Susan were the parents of two children:

 Sergei "Serge" Sergeivich Belosselsky-Belozersky (1895–1978), who married Florence Crane Robinson (1890–1969), the former wife of William Albert Robinson and daughter of Richard Teller Crane, in 1943.
 Andrei "Andre" Sergeivich Belosselsky-Belozersky (1909–1961), a bachelor who was head of the "incoming news section" of the BBC.

Belosselsky-Belozersky died on April 20, 1951 in Tonbridge, Kent, England.

References

External links

 Prince Sergei Sergeievich Belosselsky-Belozersky (1898-1978) at the National Portrait Gallery, London.

1867 births
1951 deaths
Emigrants from the Russian Empire to the United Kingdom
International Olympic Committee members
Russian princes
Imperial Russian Army generals
Russian sportsmen
White Russian emigrants to the United Kingdom